Back by Thug Demand is the seventh studio album by American rapper Trick Daddy. It was released on December 18, 2006 through Slip-N-Slide/Atlantic Records. Recording sessions took place at Dunk Ryders Studio, Circle House Studios, the Hit Factory Criteria-Miami, and Icon Studios in Miami, at PatchWerk Recording Studios and Zac Studios in Atlanta. Production was handled by Gold Ru$h, The Runners, Kane Beatz, Bigg D, Gorilla Tek, Khao, and Mannie Fresh. It features guest appearances from Fiend, 8Ball, Birdman, Chamillionaire, Dray Skky, Dunk Ryders, Gold Ru$h, Jaheim, Rick Ross, Trey Songz, Trina, Webbie, Young Buck and Young Steff.

Book of Thugs: Part II was the tentative title name for the album before he changed it. The first single for the album is "Bet That" featuring Chamillionaire and Gold Rush, with production from The Runners. The second single was going to be "Straight Up" featuring Young Buck, but it was changed to "Tuck Ya Ice" featuring Birdman.

Track listing

Notes
 signifies a vocal producer.

Charts

Weekly charts

Year-end charts

References

External links

2006 albums
Trick Daddy albums
Atlantic Records albums
Albums produced by Kane Beatz
Albums produced by the Runners
Albums produced by Mannie Fresh
Albums produced by Disco D